Antonio Redetti (1696-1773) was the bishop of Bergamo from 1731 to 1773.

References 

1697 births
1773 deaths
Bishops of Bergamo
18th-century Roman Catholic bishops in the Republic of Venice